A statue of Tadeusz Kościuszko by Theo Alice Ruggles Kitson is installed in Boston's Public Garden, in the U.S. state of Massachusetts.

Description and history
The memorial was commissioned by the Polish people of New England on September 28, 1922. It was cast in 1927, and dedicated on September 28 of that year. The bronze sculpture of Kościuszko measures approximately 10 ft. x 32 in. x 27 in., and rests on a granite base that measures approximately 6 ft. x 6 ft. x 5 ft. 7 in. The work was surveyed as part of the Smithsonian Institution's "Save Outdoor Sculpture!" program in 1993.

See also

 1927 in art

References

External links
 

1927 establishments in Massachusetts
1927 sculptures
Boston Public Garden
Bronze sculptures in Massachusetts
Granite sculptures in Massachusetts
Monuments and memorials in Boston
Boston
Outdoor sculptures in Boston
Polish-American culture in Massachusetts
Sculptures of men in Massachusetts
Statues in Boston